Jack Leonard "Jay" Barrs, Jr. (born July 17, 1962) is an American archer. He won a gold medal in the 1988 Summer Olympics.  He is an NAA National Outdoor Champion and FITA World Field Champion, as well as a fourteen time NAA US Field Champion.  Barrs was born in Jacksonville, Florida and graduated from Arizona State University.

Olympic Tournament History
 1992 Olympic Games: individual (5th), team (6th)
 1988 Olympic Games: individual (1st), team (2nd)

World Tournament History
 World Target Championships – 1999 (10th) team (3rd); 1995 (12th) team (3rd); 1989 (9th) team (2nd); 1987 (3rd) team (2nd)
 World Indoor Championships – 1991 (2nd)
 World Field Championships - `00 (8th), 1998 (4th), team (4th); 1994 (10th), 1992 (1st), 1990 (1st), 1988 (3rd)

US National Tournaments
U.S. Outdoor Target Championships – 2000 (3rd), 1999 (4th), 1997 (3rd), 1996 (3rd), 1995 (8th), 1994 (1st), 1993 (1st), 1992 (2nd), 1991 (4th), 1990 (6th), 1989 (6th), 1988 (1st), 1987 (2nd), 1986 (3rd)

 U.S. Indoor Target Championships – 2001 (11th), `00 (15th), 1999 (3rd-tie), 1997 (10th), 1996 (5th), 1995 (5th), 1994 (2nd), 1993 (1st), 1992 (1st), 1991 (2nd), 1990 (3rd), 1989 (6th), 1988 (1st), 1987 (1st)
 U.S. Field Championships – 2000 (1st), 1999 (1st), 1998 (1st), 1997 (1st), 1996 (1st), 1995 (1st), 1994 (1st), 1992 (1st), 1991 (1st), 1990 (1st), 1989 (2nd), 1988 (1st), 1987 (1st).

References

1962 births
American male archers
Archers at the 1988 Summer Olympics
Archers at the 1992 Summer Olympics
Living people
Olympic gold medalists for the United States in archery
Olympic silver medalists for the United States in archery
World Archery Championships medalists
Medalists at the 1988 Summer Olympics
Pan American Games gold medalists for the United States
Pan American Games silver medalists for the United States
Pan American Games medalists in archery
Archers at the 1987 Pan American Games
Archers at the 1991 Pan American Games
Competitors at the 2001 World Games
World Games gold medalists
Medalists at the 1987 Pan American Games
Medalists at the 1991 Pan American Games